Small packet, also called packages, is a postal term that is internationally defined as mails less than 2 kg. Commonly, small items that are not flat enough to be sent as ordinary letter would be sent as small packets.

Gallery

References

Postal systems
Philatelic terminology